WKNJ-FM (90.3 FM) is a college radio station at Kean University and is completely managed and operated by Kean students. WKNJ's studios are located on the 4th floor of the Center For Academic Success building, room 401.

General
WKNJ's transmitter is located on the Union campus of Kean University. WKNJs FM license is held by the Board of Trustees of Kean University. WKNJ broadcasts on 90.3 megahertz on weekdays 24 hours a day, and on the internet 24 hours a day, 7 days a week.

External links
Kean University
WKNJ Myspace
 WKNJ Website

KNJ
Radio stations established in 1975